Darryl Keith Roberts (born November 26, 1990) is an American football cornerback who is a free agent. He played college football for Marshall and was drafted by the New England Patriots in the seventh round of the 2015 NFL Draft. He has also been a member of the New York Jets, Detroit Lions, and Washington Football Team.

Professional career

New England Patriots
The New England Patriots selected Roberts in the seventh round (247th overall) of the 2015 NFL Draft. He signed his four-year rookie contract, worth 2.3 million, on May 8, 2015.

During training camp, Roberts competed to be a backup cornerback against Tarell Brown, Robert McClain, Bradley Fletcher, Justin Coleman, and Leonard Johnson. On September 1, 2015, Roberts was placed on season-ending injured reserve after injuring his wrist in the first preseason game against the Green Bay Packers. Roberts was released on September 3, 2016.

New York Jets
Roberts was claimed off waivers by the New York Jets on September 4, 2016. In 2018, Roberts played in all 16 games with 10 starts, recording 48 combined tackles, seven passes defensed, and an interception. On March 14, 2019, Roberts signed a three-year, $18 million contract extension with the Jets. Roberts was released on March 21, 2020.

Detroit Lions
On April 2, 2020, the Detroit Lions signed Roberts to a one-year contract. He was placed on injured reserve on November 7, 2020, and was re-activated a month later.

Washington Football Team
Roberts signed with the Washington Football Team on March 26, 2021. He was placed on injured reserve on October 13, 2021, and returned to the active roster on December 2, 2021. On December 11, he was placed on COVID-19 reserve list and was activated again three days later.

References

External links
 Marshall Thundering Herd bio 

1990 births
Living people
American football cornerbacks
Detroit Lions players
Lakeland High School (Lakeland, Florida) alumni
Marshall Thundering Herd football players
New England Patriots players
New York Jets players
Players of American football from Florida
Sportspeople from Lakeland, Florida
Washington Football Team players